Election will be held in Northern Mindanao for seats in the House of Representatives of the Philippines on May 9, 2016.

Summary

Bukidnon
Each of Bukidnon's four legislative districts will elect each representative to the House of Representatives. The candidate with the highest number of votes wins the seat.

1st District
Ma. Lourdes O. Acosta-Alba is the incumbent.

2nd District
Florencio T. Flores Jr is the incumbent and running unopposed.

3rd District
Jose Ma. F. Zubiri III is the incumbent but ineligible for reelection due to term limit.

4th District
Rogelio Neil Roque is the incumbent.

Cagayan de Oro
Each of Cagayan de Oro's two legislative districts will elect each representative to the House of Representatives. The candidate with the highest number of votes wins the seat.

1st District
Rolando Uy is the incumbent.

2nd District
Rufus Rodriguez is the incumbent but ineligible for reelection. He is running for city mayor instead.

Camiguin
Xavier Jesus D. Romualdo is the incumbent

Iligan City
Vicente Belmonte, Jr. (LP) is the incumbent. However, he is already on his last term and ineligible for reelection. Instead, he decided to run for mayor. However, he later dropped his candidacy.

Lanao del Norte
Each of Lanao del Norte's two legislative districts will elect each representative to the House of Representatives. The candidate with the highest number of votes wins the seat.

1st District
Imelda D.C. Quibranza-Dimaporo is the incumbent but not seeking for reelection. She is running for governor instead. His party nominated incumbent governor Khalid Dimaporo.

2nd District
Abdullah D. Dimaporo is the incumbent.

Misamis Occidental
Each of Misamis Occidental's two legislative districts will elect each representative to the House of Representatives. The candidate with the highest number of votes wins the seat.

1st District
Jorge T. Almonte is the incumbent.

2nd District
Henry S. Oaminal is the incumbent and running unopposed.

Misamis Oriental
Each of Misamis Oriental's two legislative districts will elect each representative to the House of Representatives. The candidate with the highest number of votes wins the seat.

1st District
Peter M. Unabia is the incumbent.

2nd District
Juliette T. Uy is the incumbent.

References

External links
COMELEC - Official website of the Philippine Commission on Elections (COMELEC)
NAMFREL - Official website of National Movement for Free Elections (NAMFREL)
PPCRV - Official website of the Parish Pastoral Council for Responsible Voting (PPCRV)

2016 Philippine general election
Lower house elections in Northern Mindanao